Duolingo is an American educational technology company which produces learning apps and provides language certification.

The platform was founded in 2011 by Luis von Ahn and Severin Hacker and has since grown to become one of the most popular language learning apps in the world.

Duolingo offers a wide range of language courses, teaching over 100 languages, from popular languages such as English, Spanish, French, and German, to less commonly studied languages such as Welsh, Irish, and Swahili. Duolingo also offers the Duolingo English Test certification program and a literacy app for children called Duolingo ABC, and the company released an elementary level math app called Duolingo Math currently exclusive to iOS.

The company uses a freemium model with over 500 million registered users. Duolingo offers a premium service which eliminates advertising and offers more features.

History 

The idea for Duolingo was initiated at the end of 2009 in Pittsburgh by Carnegie Mellon University professor Luis von Ahn and his Swiss-born post-graduate student Severin Hacker. Von Ahn had sold his second company, reCAPTCHA, to Google and, with Hacker, wanted to work on something related to education. A driving motivation was Von Ahn's upbringing in Guatemala, where he saw how expensive it was for people in his community to learn English.  Hacker (co-founder and current CTO of Duolingo) believed that "free education will really change the world" and wanted to supply people an outlet to do so.

The project was originally sponsored by Luis von Ahn's MacArthur fellowship and a National Science Foundation grant. The founders considered creating Duolingo as a nonprofit organization but Von Ahn judged this model as unsustainable. An early revenue stream was as a crowdsourced translation service. This was replaced as a source of revenue by a Duolingo English Test certification program, advertising and subscription.

In October 2011, Duolingo announced that it had raised $3.3 million from a Series A round of funding, led by Union Square Ventures, with participation from author Tim Ferriss and actor Ashton Kutcher's investing firm A-Grade Investments. Duolingo launched a private beta on November 27, 2011, and accumulated a waiting list of more than 300,000 people. The platform launched to the general public on June 19, 2012, at which point the waiting list had grown to around 500,000.

In September 2012, Duolingo announced that it had raised a further $15 million from a Series B funding round led by New Enterprise Associates, with participation from Union Square Ventures. In November 2012, Duolingo released an iPhone app, followed an Android app in May 2013, at which time Duolingo had a user base of around 3 million. By July 2013, the service had grown to 5 million users and was rated the #1 free education app in the Google Play store.

In February 2014, Duolingo announced that it had raised $20 million from a Series C funding round led by Kleiner Caufield & Byers, with prior investors also participating. At this time, Duolingo had 34 employees and reported having about 25 million registered users and 12.5 million active users, though it later reported a figure closer to 60 million users.

In June 2015, Duolingo announced that it had raised $45 million from a Series D funding round led by Google Capital, bringing its total funding to $83.3 million. The round valued the company at around $470 million, with 100 million registered users globally. In April 2016, it was reported that Duolingo had more than 18 million monthly users.

In July 2017, Duolingo announced that it had raised $25 million in a Series E funding round led by Drive Capital, bringing its total funding to $108.3 million. The round valued Duolingo at $700 million, and the company reported passing 200 million registered users, with 25 million active users. It was reported that Duolingo had 95 employees. Funds from the Series E round would be directed toward creating initiatives such as a related educational flashcard app, TinyCards, and testbeds for initiatives related to reading and listening comprehension. On 1 August 2018, Duolingo surpassed 300 million registered users.

In December 2019, it was announced that Duolingo raised $30 million in a Series F funding round from Alphabet's investment company CapitalG. The round valued Duolingo at $1.5 billion. Duolingo reported 30 million active users at this time. Headcount at the company had increased to 200, and new offices had been opened in Seattle, New York and Beijing.

Duolingo planned to use the funds to develop new products and further expand its team in sectors like engineering, business development, design, curriculum and content creators, community outreach, and marketing.

In October 2013, Duolingo launched a crowdsourced language incubator. In March 2021, Duolingo announced that it will be ending its volunteer contributor program and donating money to its volunteer contributors who helped to make Duolingo. The company said that from now on, language courses will be maintained and developed by professional linguists aligning with CEFR standards. On 28 June 2021, Duolingo filed for an initial public offering on NASDAQ under the ticker DUOL. From August 2021 to June 2022, the Duolingo language learning app was removed from some app stores in China.

In the early 2020s, Duolingo was noted for their viral videos on the social media platform TikTok.

In August 2022, Duolingo overhauled its user interface and user experience, changing the structure of the courses from a tree-like design where users could choose from a range of lessons after completing previous ones, to a linear progression. This was widely criticized by users across a variety of social media outlets, including Reddit and Twitter. CEO Luis von Ahn said that they had no plans of undoing the changes, commenting that their decision was made in order to simplify Duolingo for new users, and that maintaining both the old and new versions would be difficult.
In October 2022, Duolingo acquired Detroit-based animation studio Gunner.

Services

Duolingo language app 
Duolingo uses a gamified approach to language learning, with lessons that incorporate translating, interactive exercises, quizzes, and stories to make learning more engaging and fun. The platform also uses a unique algorithm that adapts to each learner's level and learning style, providing personalised feedback and recommendations to help them improve their skills. 

For some languages Duolingo offers podcasts for people in intermediate level consisting on stories told usually by native speakers from different parts of the world where the target language is spoken, but with simplified grammar, vocabulary, and with a slower intonation, as well with occasional assistance with providing context or explanations of unusual words in the source language by a narrator.

Duolingo also provides a competitive space. In Leagues, people can compete against their friends or see how they stack up against the rest of the world in randomly selected groupings of up to 30 users. Rankings in leagues are determined by the amount of XP earned in a week. Badges in Duolingo represent achievements that are earned from completing specific objectives or challenges.

Duolingo provides features designed to allow teachers to track students' progress in language acquisition.

Most language-learning features in Duolingo are free of charge, but it has periodic advertising in both its mobile and web browser applications, which users can remove by paying a subscription fee or promoting referral links. This feature is known as "Super Duolingo" and includes benefits such as unlimited hearts (retries), level skipping, no ads, and progress quizzes.

Duolingo offers courses in the following languages:

 Arabic
 Catalan
 Chinese (Cantonese)
 Chinese (Mandarin)
 Czech 
 Danish
 Dutch
 English
 Esperanto
 Finnish 
 French 
 German 
 Greek 
 Guaraní
 Haitian Creole
 Hawaiian 
 Hebrew 
 High Valyrian 
 Hindi 
 Hungarian 
 Indonesian 
 Irish 
 Italian 
 Japanese
 Klingon
 Korean 
 Latin 
 Navajo
 Norwegian 
 Polish 
 Portuguese 
 Romanian 
 Russian 
 Scottish Gaelic 
 Spanish 
 Swahili
 Swedish 
 Turkish 
 Ukrainian 
 Vietnamese 
 Welsh

 Yiddish
 Zulu

A course on Xhosa for English is in the works; it will be released in 2024.

Duolingo ABC 
Duolingo ABC is a mobile app for young children for learning letters, their sounds, phonics, and other foundational early reading concepts that was released in 2020. Duolingo ABC is free to use, and it does not contain any ads or in-app purchases. The app is available on iOS and Android devices, and is currently offered in English.

Duolingo Math 
Duolingo Math is a mobile app for learning elementary mathematics in a form similar to the original app, released in October 2022. It is currently only available on iOS devices.

Duolingo English Test 
Duolingo English Test (DET) is an online English proficiency test that measures a person's ability to communicate in English. The test is designed to assess a person's proficiency in the areas of reading, writing, speaking, and listening.

The Duolingo English Test is entirely computer-based and can be taken from any location with an internet connection. The test is scored on a scale of 10-160, with scores above 120 considered to be proficient in English. The test is adaptive, which means that the difficulty level of the questions adjusts to the test-taker's ability level.

One of the main advantages of the Duolingo English Test is its convenience and accessibility. Test-takers can take the test at any time, from anywhere in the world, and receive their results within 48 hours. Additionally, the test is affordable and typically costs less than other English proficiency tests such as TOEFL or IELTS.

The Duolingo English Test is recognized by many universities, colleges, and other organizations as an alternative to other English proficiency tests.

Business model 
Duolingo had a revenue of $1 million in 2016, $13 million in 2017, $36 million in 2018, and $250.77 million in 2021. In May 2022, it was reported that 6.8% of Duolingo's monthly active users pay for the ad-free version of the app. Duolingo derived most of its revenue from subscription, advertising, and its Duolingo English Test. In April 2020, Duolingo passed one million paid subscribers. In March 2022, it had 2.9 million paid subscribers.

Reception

Effectiveness 
A 2017 study found no significant difference between elementary students learning Spanish through the "gamification" of Duolingo and those learning in classroom environments, with both groups demonstrating a similar increase in achievements and self-efficacy.

A 2022 study on adults using Duolingo as their only language learning tool, published in the journal Foreign Language Annals, found that the participants that completed a course had similar proficiency to university students after four semesters of study. The authors therefore suggested that Duolingo could be an effective tool for foreign language learning. Another 2022 study of Malaysian students learning French published by the National University of Malaysia Press found that it facilitated acquisition of vocabulary, with the authors suggesting that it was well suited for beginners in this regard.

Linguist Steven Sacco at San Diego State University attempted to test Duolingo's claim that "34 hours of Duolingo are equivalent to a full university semester of language education" by completing a course in Swedish, and taking a standardized elementary exam, ultimately receiving a failing grade. Sacco suggested that Duolingo is helpful for learning vocabulary only in addition to immersion environments like a classroom.

Awards 
In 2013, Apple chose Duolingo as its iPhone App of the Year, the first time this honor had been awarded to an educational application. In 2013, Duolingo ranked  on Fast Company's "The World's Most Innovative Companies: Education Honorees" list "for crowdsourcing web translation by turning it into a free language-learning program". Duolingo won Best Education Startup at the 2014 Crunchies, and was the most downloaded app in the Education category in Google Play in 2013 and 2014.

In 2015, Duolingo was announced the 2015 award winner in Play & Learning category by Design to Improve Life. Duolingo won Inc. magazine's Best Workplaces 2018, Entrepreneur magazine's Top Company Culture List 2018, and appeared in CNBC's 2018 and 2019 "Disruptor 50" lists and TIME magazine's 50 Genius Companies. In 2019, Duolingo was named one of Forbes's "Next Billion-Dollar Startups 2019". In July 2020, Duolingo was named by PCMag as "The Best Free Language Learning App".

In popular culture 
Due to the app's sometimes aggressive sense of humor and attempts to ensure learners use it on a daily basis, Duolingo's mascot, a green cartoon owl named Duo, has been a subject of an Internet meme in which the mascot is "evil" and will stalk and threaten users if they do not keep using the app. Acknowledging the meme, Duolingo released a video on April Fool's Day 2019; the video depicts a new feature called "Duolingo Push". In the video, users of "Duolingo Push" will receive reminders to use the app in person by Duo himself, who stares at users and follows them around until they use the app (in the video, Duo is depicted by a person in a large mascot costume). On 1 April 2022, Duolingo released another video in the form of a spoof legal advertisement where the lawyers sue the company for damages due to family members going missing, once again alluding to the meme.

In November 2019, Saturday Night Live parodied Duolingo in a sketch in which adults learn to communicate with children using a fictitious course on the app entitled "Duolingo for Talking to Children".

See also
 Computer-assisted language learning
 Gamification
 Language education
 Language pedagogy
 List of language self-study programs

Notes

References

External links 

 

 
Social networking language-learning websites
Proprietary language learning software
Education companies established in 2011
Internet properties established in 2011
American educational websites
2011 establishments in Pennsylvania
Companies based in Pittsburgh
IOS software
Android (operating system) software
2021 initial public offerings
Companies listed on the Nasdaq